"Don't Play with It" is a single by American rapper Lola Brooke featuring American rapper Billy B. It was released in May 2021 and produced by Dizzy Banko. The song was a sleeper hit, gaining traction through the video-sharing app TikTok in 2022 and becoming the breakout hit of both artists.

Background
In an interview with Brooklyn Magazine, when asked how the song came about, Lola Brooke stated, "I was tired of people playing with me, for real. That's really what it was." Brooke was at home when Dizzy Banko was playing her some beats over the phone, and after hearing one of the beats, immediately told him to send it to her. She said, "I was listening to that and I was like 'Don't play with it, don't play with it, don't play with it!'" The song was originally a freestyle; according to Brooke, "I was walking back and forth in the house, and I was like, 'Don't play with it, don't play with it' and I just kept going." After recording the song in the studio, she left an open verse, eventually choosing rapper Billy B for a guest appearance because they were both from Brooklyn.

Release and promotion
The song was released on May 14, 2021, along with a music video. Lola Brooke garnered further recognition for the song with a performance on "From the Block" in November 2021. It caught widespread attention via TikTok in 2022; by October of that year, the video surpassed over 500,000 views. The song considerably increased in streams on Spotify, amassing two million streams in November 2022. As a result of its success, Brooke received cosigns from various celebrities, including rappers Missy Elliott, Cardi B, Meek Mill, JT of the City Girls, Saucy Santana and Pusha T, Ella Mai, Kim Kardashian and Shaquille O'Neal, and eventually signed to Arista Records.

Charts

References

2021 singles
2021 songs
Drill songs
Arista Records singles